Gurani Rural District is a rural district (dehestan) in Gahvareh District, Dalahu County, Kermanshah Province, Iran. At the 2006 census, its population was 6,514, in 1,499 families. The rural district has 54 villages.

References 

Rural Districts of Kermanshah Province
Dalahu County